Muddy Hole was a settlement in Newfoundland and Labrador. 
It is featured in the beginning of Farley Mowat's 1969 book The Boat Who Wouldn't Float. The exact location of this town is unknown, but the text places it somewhere along Newfoundland's easternmost end, south of Ferryland.

References

 Location:

Ghost towns in Newfoundland and Labrador